This article concerns the period 309 BC – 300 BC.

References